Samuel S. Yoder (August 16, 1841 – May 11, 1921) was an American Civil War veteran and politician who served two terms as a U.S. Representative from Ohio from 1887 to 1891.

Biography
Born in Berlin, Ohio, Yoder attended the common schools, Wooster (Ohio) University, and graduated from the University of Michigan at Ann Arbor.

Civil War 
During the American Civil War, he enlisted in the Union Army in the One Hundred and Twenty-eighth Regiment, Ohio Volunteer Infantry, beginning April 19, 1862.  He rose to the rank of lieutenant and served until the end of the war.  After the war, he studied medicine and practiced in Bluffton, Ohio, where he served as mayor from 1868 to 1878.

Political career 
Yoder moved to Lima, Ohio, in 1878, and began to study law.  He was admitted to the bar in 1880 and commenced practice in Lima.  He served as member of the Democratic State executive committee from 1883 to 1885, and as judge of the probate court of Allen County from February 1882 to October 1886, when he resigned, having been elected to Congress.

Yoder was elected as a Democrat to the Fiftieth and Fifty-first Congresses (March 4, 1887 – March 3, 1891).  He was not a candidate for renomination in 1890.

Later career and death 
He served as Sergeant at Arms of the House of Representatives from December 8, 1891, to August 7, 1893.  He continued the practice of law and also engaged in the real estate business in Washington, D.C., until his death.  He is interred in Arlington National Cemetery.

See also

References

 Retrieved on 2008-02-11

1841 births
1921 deaths
Sergeants at Arms of the United States House of Representatives
University of Michigan alumni
Union Army officers
Ohio state court judges
People from Berlin, Holmes County, Ohio
People from Bluffton, Ohio
Burials at Arlington National Cemetery
Ohio lawyers
Mayors of places in Ohio
College of Wooster alumni
People of Ohio in the American Civil War
Physicians from Ohio
19th-century American lawyers
Democratic Party members of the United States House of Representatives from Ohio